These are the official results of the Men's Discus Throw event at the 1991 World Championships in Tokyo, Japan. There were a total of 36 participating athletes, with the final held on Tuesday August 27, 1991.

Medalists

Schedule
All times are Japan Standard Time (UTC+9)

Abbreviations
All results shown are in metres

Qualification
 Held on Monday 1991-08-26

Final

See also
 1990 Men's European Championships Discus Throw
 1992 Men's Olympic Discus Throw
 1994 Men's European Championships Discus Throw

References
 Results

D
Discus throw at the World Athletics Championships